The National Gendarmerie (Gendarmerie Nationale) is the national gendarmerie force of Burkina Faso. It is one of the two national police forces, alongside the civilian National Police force.

The service is a branch of the Burkina Faso military acting under the authority of the Minister of Defence.

Ranks

See also

Law enforcement in Burkina Faso

References

External links
Burkina Faso police rescue more than 100 child trafficking victims during INTERPOL-supported operation.

Law of Burkina Faso
Military of Burkina Faso